Big Sandy High School is a small public secondary school in Big Sandy, Chouteau County, Montana. They are known as the Pioneers.

References

Public high schools in Montana
Schools in Chouteau County, Montana